Christopher Rapalo is a photographer, filmmaker, and owner of Miami production company, Third Dream Media. He is known for his debut documentary, Retro Couture (2016) which debuted at the Miami Fashion Film Festival and has gone onto international film festivals.

References

Year of birth missing (living people)
Living people
American filmmakers
American photographers